Wrens are passerine birds in the mainly New World family Troglodytidae.

Wren may also refer to:

Organisms 
Birds in Troglodytidae:
 Since the Eurasian wren is the only wren in the Old World, it is often just called 'wren'
 Birds other than Troglodytidae:
 New Zealand wren (Acanthisittidae)
 Maluridae, the Australasian "wrens"
 Acanthizidae subfamily Sericornithinae, the scrubwrens, heathwrens and fernwren

People and fictional characters 
 Wren (name)

Places 
 Wren, Alabama, unincorporated community in Lawrence County
 Wren, Mississippi, village
 Wren, Ohio, village
 Wren, Oregon, unincorporated community
 Wren, Virginia, unincorporated community 
 Wrens, Georgia, small city

Nicknames 
 Wrens of the Curragh, nickname given to camp women and prostitutes servicing the British Army in the Curragh Camp in Co. Kildare, Ireland in the 19th century
 Wrens, nickname of members of the British Women's Royal Naval Service (WRNS) 
 Wrens, nickname of members of the Women's Royal Canadian Naval Service (WRCNS)
 The Wrens, a nickname for the Rydalmere Cricket Club, New South Wales, Australia

Music 
 The Wrens, a band from New Jersey, USA formed in the 1980s
 The Wrens (R&B band), a doo-wop singing group from New York City from the 1950s
 Wren (record label), Wales

Radio stations
 WREN (AM), a defunct radio station (590 AM) licensed to Carrollton, Alabama, United States
 WREN-LP, a low-power radio station (97.9 FM) licensed to Charlottesville, Virginia, United States
 KYYS, a radio station in Kansas City, Kansas, United States, licensed as WREN from 1927 until 1999.

Other 
 Wren Building, the oldest academic building in the USA, at the College of William & Mary, Virginia
 Wren & Martin, a series of English grammar textbooks published in India
 Wren Society, a secret society at the College of William & Mary
 HMS Wren, two ships of the Royal Navy
 English Electric Wren, a 1920s British ultralight monoplane
 Wren Day is celebrated on 26 December in Ireland
 Wadebridge Renewable Energy Network
 Wren's Super Wax Shoe Polish, a shoe polish brand existing since 1889
 Wren Kitchens, a British kitchen retailer, designer and manufacturer.

See also 
 Ren (disambiguation)